Tomohiro Hase from Ryukoku University, in Shiga, Japan was named Fellow of the Institute of Electrical and Electronics Engineers (IEEE) in 2016 for contributions to embedded software for real-time applications.

References

Fellow Members of the IEEE
Living people
Year of birth missing (living people)
Place of birth missing (living people)